Henryk Kroll (born January 20, 1949 in Gogolin) is a Polish politician, and the former leader of German minority in Poland. He was initially elected to Sejm (Polish Parliament) in 1991. In the Polish parliamentary elections of September 25, 2005, he achieved 7852 votes in 21 Opole district, from "Mniejszość Niemiecka" (German Minority) list. He remained a member of the Sejm until his defeat at the Polish parliamentary elections of 2007.

He was also a member of Sejm 1991-1993, Sejm 1993-1997, Sejm 1997-2001, and Sejm 2001-2005.

See also
Members of Polish Sejm 2005-2007

External links
Henryk Kroll - parliamentary page - includes declarations of interest, voting record, and transcripts of speeches.

Members of the Polish Sejm 1991–1993
Members of the Polish Sejm 1993–1997
Members of the Polish Sejm 1997–2001
Members of the Polish Sejm 2001–2005
Members of the Polish Sejm 2005–2007
1949 births
Polish people of German descent
Living people
Polish veterinarians
Recipients of the Cross of the Order of Merit of the Federal Republic of Germany